Soccer Alaska is the governing body of amateur adult soccer in  the state of Alaska, United States. They are not directly affiliated with FIFA or CONCACAF. They are affiliated to the Governing body of amateur adult soccer USASA.

External links 
Official site of the Football Association Soccer Alaska
The National Select Team Program on www.usasa.com
Football Association Soccer Alaska on www.rsssf.com
Alaska on www.fedefutbol.net

1995 establishments in Alaska
Organizations based in Anchorage, Alaska
Soccer in Alaska
Alaska
Sports organizations established in 1995